The 1511 Idrija earthquake occurred on March 26 with a maximum Mercalli intensity of X (Extreme). The epicenter was around the town of Idrija in present-day Slovenia, although some place it some 15-20 kilometers to the west, between Gemona and Pulfero in Friulian Slovenia. The earthquake affected a large territory between Carinthia, Friuli, present-day Slovenia and Croatia. An estimated twelve to fifteen thousand people were killed and damage was considered severe. The earthquake was felt as far as in Switzerland and present-day Slovakia. A number of castles and churches were razed to the ground in a large area from Northeastern Italy to western Croatia. Among the destroyed buildings were the castles of Udine and Škofja Loka, the monastery of the Teutonic Knights in Ljubljana; the Zagreb cathedral was severely damaged.  Blaž Raškaj, commander of the Jajce fortess, in modern Bosnia, reported to the Hungarian Estates that the earthquake had severely damaged the fortifications.

The reconstruction of the destroyed buildings in the following decades is considered the dividing line between Gothic and Renaissance architecture in the art history of the Eastern Alps.

See also
1976 Friuli earthquake
Idrija Fault

References

Sources

External links
 Page on the 1511 Idrija earthquake from the CFTI5 Catalogue of Strong Earthquakes in Italy (461 BC – 1997) and Mediterranean Area (760 B.C. – 1500) Guidoboni E., Ferrari G., Mariotti D., Comastri A., Tarabusi G., Sgattoni G., Valensise G. (2018) (in Italian)

Idrija
Earthquakes in Slovenia